The Cape Town Ladies Open is a golf tournament on the Sunshine Ladies Tour in Cape Town, South Africa. 

It has been played annually at Royal Cape Golf Club since 2015, except in 2020 when it was played at the King David Mowbray Golf Club and in 2023 when it was held at Atlantic Beach Links & Golf Club.

Winners

See also
Cape Town Open

References

External links
Coverage at the Sunshine Tour's official website

Sunshine Ladies Tour events
Golf tournaments in South Africa
Sport in Cape Town